Clarksville High School is a public high school located in Clarksville, Texas, United States. It is part of the Clarksville Independent School District located in central Red River County and classified as a 2A school by the University Interscholastic League (UIL). In 2013, the school was rated "Met Standard" by the Texas Education Agency.

Accountability Rating
In past years, the campus had fallen victim to lower and lower test scores on the state-mandated TAKS Test. The District was determined to turn things around.  After much hard work from educators and students, the Clarksville High School went from being an unacceptable campus to a "Recognized Campus" in 2009-2010.

Activities
The Clarksville Tigers compete in the following activities:

Cross Country, Volleyball, Football, Basketball, Powerlifting, Track.

The Clarksville Tigers Basketball Team captured the State Championship March 2012. That same year the boys track team won the state title in the 4x100 meter relay. The Clarksville Tigers Football team were Regional Quarter Finalists in 2011.  The football team made school history in November 2010 by advancing to the regional playoffs.

The Lady Tigers Basketball Team were Regional Quarter Finalists in 2011.

The CHS Tiger Band placed 4th in the Texas STATE Marching Championship in 2011.
The band also placed 1st in the Texas STATE Marching Championship on November 7, 2017, making them the 2017 2a State Marching Champion.

State Titles
Boys Basketball - 
1995(3A), 1998(3A), 2012(1A/D1)
Marching Band -
2017(2A)

State Finalists
Boys Basketball -
1989(3A), 1991(3A)

Notable alumni
Gary VanDeaver (Class of 1976), former superintendent of the New Boston Independent School District and incoming 2015 Republican member of the Texas House of Representatives from Bowie, Franklin, Lamar, and Red River counties.

References

External links
 Clarksville Independent School District

Educational institutions established in the 1980s
Educational institutions in the United States with year of establishment missing
Schools in Red River County, Texas
Public high schools in Texas